Toby Jones (born 1966) is an English actor.

Toby Jones may also refer to:

 Toby Jones (artist) (born 1967), American artist
 Toby Jones (novel series), an Australian cricket fantasy novel series, written by Michael Panckridge and Brett Lee
 Theobald Jones (1790–1868), also known as Toby Jones, Irish officer in the Royal Navy, MP for County Londonderry, and lichenologist
 Toby Craig Jones, historian
 An internet character portrayed by Robert L. Hines

See also
Tobias Jones (disambiguation)